Paulino is a surname and a masculine given name. It is a Spanish and Portuguese form of the Roman family name Paulinus, which was itself derived from the Roman family name Paulus meaning "small" or "humble" in Latin.

People with the given name
 Clodoaldo Paulino de Lima (born 1978), Brazilian footballer
 Luis Paulino Siles (born 1941), retired  Costa Rican football referee
 Paulino Alcántara (1896–1964), Spanish football player and manager
 Paulino Frydman (1905–1982), Polish chess master
 Paulino Martínez (born 1952), former Spanish racing cyclist
 Paulino Martínez Soria (or simply "Paulino", born 1973), Spanish retired footballer
 Paulino Masip (1899–1963), Spanish playwright, screenwriter and novelist
 Paulino Monsalve (born 1958), Spanish field hockey player
 Paulino Rivero (born 1952), Spanish politician
 Paulino Uzcudun (1899–1985), Basque heavyweight boxer

People with the surname 
 Evair Aparecido Paulino (born 1965), retired Brazilian football player
 Maselino Paulino (born 1988), Samoan rugby player
 Quirino Paulino (born 1960), ex-captain of the army of the Dominican Republic
 Ronny Paulino (born 1981), Dominican professional baseball player
 Rosana Paulino (born 1967), Brazilian visual artist, educator and curator
 Tina Paulino (born 1974), Mozambican runner

See also
 Paul (name)
 Paula (disambiguation)
 Paulina

References

Spanish masculine given names